Judith of Bavaria, Duchess of Swabia (19 May 1100 – 27 Aug 1130) was a duchess of Swabia by marriage to Frederick II, Duke of Swabia. She was the mother of Frederick I, Holy Roman Emperor, known to history as "Barbarossa".

Life 
Judith was born 19 May 1100, the eldest daughter of Henry IX, Duke of Bavaria and Wulfhilde of Saxony, daughter of Magnus, Duke of Saxony and Sophia of Hungary, and thereby a member of the powerful German House of Welf. She had three brothers, Henry, Conrad and Welf; and three sisters, Sophia, Matilda and Wulfhild. The Historia Welforum names in order Iuditham, Mahtildem, Sophium and Wulfildem as the four daughters of Henricus dux ex Wulfilde. This is evidence that Judith was the eldest daughter. She had, in addition to her seven legitimate siblings, one half-brother, Adalbert, born of her father's relationship with an unnamed mistress.

Duchess of Swabia 
On an unknown date between 1119 and 1121, she married as his first wife, Frederick II, Duke of Swabia (1090 – 6 April 1147); this dynastic marriage united the House of Welf and the House of Hohenstaufen, the two most powerful and influential families in Germany. The Historia Welforum specified that Judith married Friderico Suevorum duci, but did not mention the date.

In 1125, her father initially supported the candidacy of her husband to succeed Emperor Henry V as King of Germany; however, he eventually switched his support to Lothar III, Holy Roman Emperor. The defection of Judith's father created an enmity between the Welfs and the Swabians that would have far-reaching consequences in Germany which would last throughout the 12th century. It is not known how this affected relations between Judith and her husband. It is curious to note that no further children were born to the couple after the birth of their daughter Bertha in 1123.

She died on 27 August 1130 and was buried at Waldburg in Heiligen Forst, Alsace. Shortly after Judith's death Frederick married, as his second wife, Agnes of Saarbrücken.

Issue
She had two children:
 Frederick I Barbarossa, Holy Roman Emperor (1122 – 10 June 1190), married on 9 June 1156 Beatrice I, Countess of Burgundy, by whom he had 12 children.
 Bertha (also called Judith) of Swabia (1123 – 18 October 1194/25 March 1195), married in 1138 Matthias I, Duke of Lorraine, by whom she had seven children.

Ancestry

References 

 Charles Cawley, Medieval Lands, Bavaria, Dukes

1100 births
1131 deaths
Women of medieval Bavaria
House of Welf
Duchesses of Swabia
Bavarian princesses
12th-century German nobility
12th-century German women
Daughters of monarchs